KHCB may refer to:

 KHCB (AM), a radio station (1400 AM) licensed to serve League City, Texas, United States
 KHCB-FM, a radio station (105.7 FM) licensed to serve Houston, Texas